La Tigra may refer to:

La Tigra, Chaco, a locality and municipality in Chaco Province, Argentina
La Tigra, San Carlos, a district of San Carlos Canton, Alajuela Province, Costa Rica
La Tigra National Park, in Honduras

See also
Le Tigre